Howard Township is one of the twenty-two townships of Knox County, Ohio, United States.  The 2010 census found 5,617 people in the township.

Geography
Located in the east central part of the county, it borders the following townships:
Brown Township - north
Union Township - east
Butler Township - southeast corner
Harrison Township - south
College Township - southwest corner
Monroe Township - west
Pike Township - northwest corner

No municipalities are located in Howard Township, although the unincorporated community of Howard lies in the southern part of the township.

Name and history
Howard Township was organized in 1825.

It is the only Howard Township statewide.

Government
The township is governed by a three-member board of trustees, who are elected in November of odd-numbered years to a four-year term beginning on the following January 1. Two are elected in the year after the presidential election and one is elected in the year before it. There is also an elected township fiscal officer, who serves a four-year term beginning on April 1 of the year after the election, which is held in November of the year before the presidential election. Vacancies in the fiscal officership or on the board of trustees are filled by the remaining trustees.

References

External links
County website
School district website

Townships in Knox County, Ohio
Townships in Ohio